The 2005–06 SM-liiga season was the 31st season of the SM-liiga, the top level of ice hockey in Finland. 14 teams participated in the league, and HPK Hämeenlinna won the championship.

Regular season

Playoffs

Preliminary round
 SaiPa - TPS 2:0 (3:2, 3:2 P)
 Blues - JYP 2:1 (3:4, 2:1, 3:2 P)

Quarterfinals
 Kärpät - Blues 4:2 (2:1 P, 4:1, 2:3, 2:1, 2:3 P, 5:2)
 HIFK - SaiPa 4:2 (4:3 P, 2:1, 4:3, 2:3, 2:5, 3:2 P)
 HPK - Ilves 4:0 (4:2, 2:1 P, 4:2, 1:0)
 Tappara - Ässät 2:4 (3:2, 1:3, 5:2, 2:5, 2:3 P, 2:3)

Semifinals
 Kärpät - Ässät 1:3 (1:3, 1:3, 6:3, 3:4)
 HIFK - HPK 2:3 (5:2, 1:2 P, 5:4 P, 0:4, 0:1)

3rd place
 Kärpät - HIFK 6:2

Final
 HPK - Ässät 3:1 (1:0, 4:5 P, 5:3, 4:1)

External links
 SM-liiga official website

1
Finnish
Liiga seasons